This is a list of public housing estates in Brunei. The list consists of housing estates under the current government housing programmes of the National Housing Scheme, including the Landless Indigenous Citizens' Housing Scheme, as well as the former National Resettlement Scheme. The housing estates may be part of village subdivisions, the third-level subdivisions of Brunei, but many of them have large enough population and hence are designated as separate villages; a few may even very large population that they are divided into few village subdivisions.

References 

 
Public housing estates in Brunei